H&I may refer to:
Highbury & Islington station, a railway station in London, England
Heroes & Icons, an American television network